José Manuel Figueroa Figueroa, Sr. (April 8, 1951 – July 13, 2015), known professionally as Joan Sebastian, was a  Mexican singer-songwriter. He composed more than 1,000 songs, including compositions for artists such as Bronco,  Vicente Fernández, Lucero, Pepe Aguilar, and Rocío Dúrcal. The first several years of his career were primarily focused on Latin pop songs, but later focused primarily on Regional Mexican music, specifically banda, mariachi, and norteño. Throughout his career, he also recorded various country songs in Spanish. Sebastian was awarded seven Latin Grammy Awards and five Grammy Awards, making him the most awarded Mexican performer in Grammy history.

Known for composing "Así es la Vida", Sebastian also worked sporadically as an actor. In 1996, he made his acting debut in the Mexican soap opera Tú y Yo (You and I), sharing credits with Maribel Guardia, his former wife and mother to his son, Julian. In 2015, Sebastian died at the age of 64 of bone cancer. At the time of his death, Sebastian had two number-one albums on the Billboard Top Latin Albums chart and seven top ten songs on the Hot Latin Songs chart in the United States.

Early life
Joan Sebastian was born in the rural town of Juliantla in Guerrero. He began composing at the age of seven. His mother enrolled him in a school near Guanajuato when he was eight years old, and returned to his hometown three years later.

At age fourteen, his father sent him away to a monastery in Morelos where he was under the care of Father David Salgado. Due to the clergyman's influence on Sebastian, he considered becoming a priest. He enrolled in the Seminario Conciliar de San José in Cuernavaca, Morelos, but realized that he wanted to pursue a music career, and decided to leave the seminary to dedicate himself to music.

Career
Before embarking on a singing career, Sebastian was an administrative assistant at a vacation resort in Oaxtepec, Morelos, where he would sing through the intercom. In 1968, Sebastian met Mexican actress Angelica Maria. They stayed together and she asked him to sing some songs for her. She suggested to Sebastian that he record the songs and give them to music producer Eduardo Magallanes, though Sebastian never managed to contact him. He later moved to Mexico City and began asking Discos Capitals Records to listen to his music and produce it. In 1974, he recorded his first album, Pedro Parrandas, and received positive feedback from the public.

In 1977, Sebastian decided to stop using his legal name, Jose Manuel Figueroa and took on his artistic name, Joan Sebastian, partly in tribute to San Sebastian, where he previously worked.   That same year, he signed a record deal with the label Musart. Later on he would make his known hit "Juliantla" and the famous duet Maracas with Alberto Vazquéz.
In 2000, he released Secreto de Amor which was certified 4× platinum in the Latin field in the United States by the Recording Industry Association of America (RIAA). The album and title track won the Lo Nuestro Awards for Regional Mexican Album of the Year and Regional Mexican Song of the Year; he also received the Excellence Award for his musical contributions.

In 2006, Sebastian was inducted into the Billboard Latin Music Hall of Fame for his prolific songwriting and musical arrangements. Sebastian was awarded Songwriter of the Year three times by ASCAP and received the Golden Note Award in 2007 in recognition of his songwriting career.

In 2012, Joan Sebastian teamed up with American songwriter and producer Will.i.am for the song and video "Hey You."

Personal life
Sebastian had eight children from five different women. Their names are José Manuel Figueroa (who is also a singer and composer), Juan Sebastián Figueroa González, Trigo de Jesús Figueroa González (first three children with Teresa González, his first wife), Zarelea Figueroa Ocampo (who is also a singer and composer), Marcos Julián Figueroa Fernández (son of Maribel Guardia, who's a singer and has a son with Imelda Tuñon), Joana Marcelia Figueroa Espín, Juliana Joeri Figueroa Alonso and D'Yave Figueroa Espín. His third oldest son, Trigo, was shot in the back of the head after one of Joan Sebastian's concerts in Mission, Texas on August 27, 2006. Trigo had been trying to control the crowd after the show. He was transported to McAllen Medical Center where he was pronounced dead.

On June 12, 2010, his second oldest son, Juan Sebastián was shot dead in Cuernavaca, Morelos, after arriving at a night club with some friends and being refused entrance. Joan Sebastian said his son's death had nothing to do with the Mexican drug cartels.

A few months after his death Televisa announced that a series about his life would begin filming. His youngest son, Julian Figueroa, portrayed his father in his younger days while his older son, José Manuel Figueroa, portrayed his father in his later days. Livia Brito was also confirmed to portray Maribel Guardia. The series Por Siempre Joan Sebastian premiered on June 27, 2016 on Univision and concluded on July 25, 2016.

On January 27, 2019, a nephew-in-law of Sebastian, Hugo Figueroa, was kidnapped before the start of a bull riding event in Tarímbaro, Michoacán. On January 31, he was found dead with multiple gunshot wounds, at kilometer 294 of the Mexico-Guadalajara highway. This marked the third violent death in the famous Mexican family. A video allegedly depicting his murder has circulated online. Figueroa was buried not far from his uncle-in-law's grave.

Illness and death
Sebastian was first diagnosed with bone cancer in 1999. He underwent cancer treatment and survived; however, he announced that the cancer had returned in 2007. Undergoing cancer treatment once again, he later announced he was in remission. On July 26, 2012, during one of his concerts, he announced that the cancer had returned for the third time. In 2014, he revealed that he was battling cancer for the fourth time during his performances in Zacatecas.

Weeks prior to his death, he confirmed to the media that he had been hospitalized and undergoing cancer treatment under medical supervision. On July 13, 2015, Joan Sebastian died at 7:15pm (UTC-06:00) at his ranch Cruz de la Sierra, Teacalco Guerrero, Mexico, due to bone cancer. He was 64 years old. His body was buried in a cemetery in Juliantla near his son Trigo.

Relatives of the late singer complained in July 2020 that Sebastian's mausoleum had been broken into and the family feared that his remains might be stolen. Security measures were increased.

Discography

Sebastian recorded the following studio albums during his music career:

Studio albums

Awards and nominations

References

External links

 www.joansebastian.com OFFICIAL website
 Discography at Starpulse.com  
 Biography at Chalino.com
 Joan's Online Memorial Website

 
Mexican male singer-songwriters
Mexican record producers
1951 births
2015 deaths
Banda musicians
Ranchera singers
Grammy Award winners
Latin Grammy Award winners
Latin music record producers
Latin music songwriters
Regional Mexican musicians
Singers from Guerrero
Writers from Guerrero
Universal Music Latin Entertainment artists
Deaths from bone cancer
Deaths from cancer in Mexico
 01
20th-century Mexican male singers
21st-century Mexican male singers